The Royal Asscher Diamond Company was founded in 1854 by the Asscher family of gemcutters. The company is responsible for cutting some of the most famous diamonds in the world including two of the top three largest diamonds ever found. Its headquarters still stand at its original location Tolstraat 127 in Amsterdam, the Netherlands. The company also has regional headquarters in New York City (Royal Asscher of America) and Tokyo (Royal Asscher of Japan).

Royal Asscher is still owned by the Asscher family, today a renowned diamond dynasty. The Asscher Diamond Company, made famous at the turn of the 20th century by Joseph and Abraham Asscher, became Royal Asscher Diamond Company in 1980 when it was bestowed with the Dutch Royal Predicate from Queen Juliana of the Netherlands in recognition of the company's stature both in the Netherlands and across the world. In 2011 Queen Beatrix perpetuated the Royal Prefix for another 25 years.

History

The establishment of the company
In 1854 Joseph Isaac Asscher, a known artisan in the diamond industry, established the I.J Asscher diamond company, named for his son Isaac Joseph Asscher, who followed in his father's footsteps and entered the diamond industry. He passed down his expertise to his five sons, including Joseph (a prolific and unrivalled diamond cleaver) and Abraham (a talented innovator and businessman). Together, they became the 20th century's most prodigious diamond experts. Under Joseph and Abraham, the company was known as the Asscher Diamond Company and cut diamonds to be set in jewellery for world famous boutiques and maisons internationally. As one of the largest diamond polishing companies in the world at that time, the company was known for having royalty, celebrities, and politicians as private clients.

The Asscher Cut
In 1902 Joseph Asscher designed and patented his namesake original Asscher cut. This emblematic cut was the world's first patented diamond cut, protecting it from replication by other companies. The Asscher Diamond Company held its exclusive patent until the Second World War and saw strong sales internationally, particularly during the 1920s and 30s when the cut and company were both at the height of success.

The original design had 58 step-cut facets, a small table, high crown and steep pavilion with cut corners. An accurate description would be a cut cornered square emerald cut diamond.

Also known as square emerald cuts, Asscher cut diamonds are roughly square in shape when viewed from above but have cut corners for more light to enter the diamond. They typically have 50 or 58 facets and their ideal length to width ratio is 1 to 1.04.

The Asscher cut was a staple of art deco and art nouveau era jewellery, with its straight lines and faceting arrangement making it perfect for clean and graphic elements brought to life by the movement.

Because of their facet arrangement, high crown, and depth, Asscher's can produce outstanding brilliance and are known for creating a ‘hall of mirrors’ effect.

The Royal Asscher Cut
Almost 100 years after the Original Asscher Cut was first conceived, Joseph Asscher's great-grand nephews, Edward and Joop Asscher, revised the design, adding sixteen additional facets to make it reminiscent of the Cullinan II diamond of the Imperial Crown.

The result is a 74-facet step-cut square diamond, absorbing the light from each angle, creating an endless mirrored pool effect, a kaleidoscope of all of the colors that make up a spectrum of light, designed to catch the eye with the brilliance of a round cut, and the intricacies of the artfully-constructed angles of an emerald cut.

The Royal Asscher Round Brilliant
By adding facets on the outside of the diamond, the Royal Asscher Round Brilliant Cut removes some of the darker elements seen in a traditional round diamond, even an ideal cut. The effect is a crisp, clear centre, which though true to the round diamond shape is distinctively different with 74 facets compared to the generic diamond's 58.

The Royal Asscher Oval Cut
Inspired by the intrinsic beauty of the slender, flattering and popular Oval shape which is often cut irregularly, the Asscher family launched The Royal Asscher Oval Cut in 2018, like the company's other diamond cuts the Royal Asscher Oval Cut is patented, with 74 facets compared to the generic round diamond's usual 58. Edward Asscher (fifth generation) and Mike Asscher (sixth generation) set out to master the creation of a consistently beautiful Oval by playing with proportions and faceting patterns, the diamond has what is typically known as a modified-brilliant faceting style.

The Royal Asscher Cushion Cut
The Royal Asscher Cushion Cut was launched in 2018, the diamond has additional faceting on the table and bottom of its design, which enhance its beauty by exposing the diamond's sparkle potential without losing the soft pillowy elegance of the cut. Like Royal Asscher's other diamond cuts the design is patented.

The Excelsior diamond
The gem required expert handling to be properly carved: inclusions within the rough diamond prevented it from being polished as a single stone. Abraham Asscher was charged with cleaving the Excelsior; to minimize flaws, he carved the stone into ten diamonds which were primarily sold to anonymous purchasers. Rumor and myth abound regarding the location of the diamonds.

The Excelsior diamond was the focal point of the 2003 Victoria's Secret Fantasy Bra valued at approximately $13 million with a jeweled panty for additional $1 million.

The Cullinan diamond
In 1905 the Cullinan diamond was discovered. At  it was a legendary find, and achieved instant renown across the globe. The diamond was presented to King Edward VII, and he invited the Asscher brothers to London to discuss cleaving the diamond. It was decided that Joseph Asscher would cleave the Cullinan into three parts, necessitated by inclusions within the rough diamond.

In February 1908 a notable audience gathered to watch Joseph Asscher cleave the huge stone. In order to yield large, beautiful diamonds he needed to hit the Cullinan in exactly the right place. On his first strike his blade broke, while the stone remained intact. He dismissed all present and set to work creating larger, stronger tools.

The following week, armed with new tools, Joseph resumed his work, allowing no one but the notary public in the cutting room. Urban legend recounts that Joseph fainted after striking the Cullinan diamond with a tremendous blow. He later commented that the adrenaline surging through him the moment the stone split was so strong all he could think to do was to examine the stone and check his workmanship over and over again before rushing to the next room to share the good news. Later, the Cullinan diamonds were polished, ready to take pride of place in Great Britain's Crown Jewels.

World War II
During the Second World War battle of the Netherlands the Nazis as part of their extermination plans, entered the Asscher Diamond Company's Amsterdam headquarters and seized its diamonds. Since the Asscher family were Jewish they were eventually deported from the Netherlands and interned in concentration camps, along with nearly all of the company's 500 master polishers. Most of the Asscher family and over 96 percent of the polishers were murdered by the Nazis.

During the war the patent on the original Asscher cut expired. With no one to renew the patent, other companies started to utilize the Asscher cut, leading to market confusion about the origin of many Asscher cut diamonds. Some companies chose to call their Asscher cut diamonds square-emerald cuts instead. Many of these diamonds were cut for yield and did not necessarily follow Joseph Asscher's original proportion calculations for the Asscher cut, which specified parameters for the diamond's crown height, table size, and facet alignment.

After the war
Only ten Asscher family members and fifteen of the five hundred polishers survived the Holocaust.  Although once the world's diamond polishing capital, the diamond industry in Amsterdam was virtually wiped out during the war, including the Asscher Diamond Company. Antwerp subsequently emerged as a major diamond polishing center.

In 1946 Joop and Louis Asscher were invited to utilize their expertise to start a new company in New York, but they chose to remain in their home of Amsterdam and rebuild the Asscher Diamond Company. At this point during the 1950s and 1960s the company began exploring new markets and became a prominent diamantaire in Japan.

Royal title
In 1980 Her Majesty Queen Juliana of the Netherlands granted the Asscher Diamond Company a royal title in tribute to the leading, century-old role the company and Asscher family held in the diamond industry. With this honor, the Asscher Diamond Company became the Royal Asscher Diamond Company.

Authenticity
The Asscher family secured international design patents on all of their cuts, so that they can not be legally imitated; Royal Asscher is also trademarked and the company owns exclusive rights to the name. To further guarantee authenticity each diamond is laser inscribed with the Royal Asscher logo and an identification number belonging to a single diamond only. The number is logged with the Royal Asscher Diamond Company in Amsterdam and a Royal Asscher certificate accompanies the diamond.

Fancy Cut Specialists
Today the Royal Asscher Diamond Company are Fancy Cut specialists. Consumer understanding of diamonds has increased with the advent of the internet, online sellers and social media. Today's consumer is willing to buy online and people looking for something individual and rare - this created a growing interest in generic fancy shape diamonds. Non-round shapes used to be much harder for customers to find and purchase. Rounds were ever popular and fancy shapes typically harder to source in beautiful variants. That's because there is no universal cut grading system existing for fancy shapes, whereas round diamond shapes have the ideal category (as best in cut class). Seeking to create a new level of perfection in this class, Royal Asscher as known pioneers of shape undertook research and development and have debuted four cuts which the company states are the shapes ultimate expressions of beauty, each cut has 16 more facets when compared to their generic counterparts.

Present
The fifth and sixth generations of the Asscher family are at the helm of an international company. Edward Asscher, father works in conjunction with daughter Lita and son Mike.

In March 2020, Edward Asscher announced his retirement from the company. With his departure, his daughter Lita Asscher and son Mike Asscher will serve as co-presidents of the firm.

The Golden Book
The company keeps a ‘Golden Book’ of visitors, who have included Emperor Hirohito of Japan, Queen Elizabeth II of the United Kingdom, and Queen Juliana and Prince Bernhard of the Netherlands.  Royal Asscher jewellery is often seen at red-carpet events.

Tolstraat 127
Designed by renowned Architect Gerrit Van Arkel the castle like structure of the original Asscher factory is today the jewel of Amsterdam's De Pijp area, Working on the principle of needing ample light for the diamonds to be worked within, the castle-like factory had huge windows and originally featured a police station outside. At one time over 500 diamond polishers worked in the building alongside numerous administrative staff and family.

In this grand building where some of the largest and most iconic diamonds in the world were cut and polished. The stature of Tolstraat 127 was so great that the area became known as the Diamantbuurt (Diamond District) with street names such as Diamantstraat (Diamond Street), Robijnstraat (Ruby Street), Saffierstraat (Sapphire Street) and Smaragdstraat (Emerald Street). Around the factory there are beautiful workers' cottages where many of the diamond polishers lived.

Now, the area is known as the “Asscher Quarter” with additional street names such as Cullinanplein. While the old factory is now a light-filled luxury apartments complex, the main tower remains Royal Asscher's headquarters to this day.

References

External links

 Royal Asscher Diamond website

Buildings and structures in Amsterdam
Manufacturing companies based in Amsterdam
Dutch companies established in 1854
Diamond cutting
19th century in Amsterdam
Organisations based in the Netherlands with royal patronage
Art Nouveau architecture in Amsterdam
Art Nouveau commercial buildings
Gemstone cutting
Manufacturing companies established in 1854